The Scheide Library once a private library, is now a permanent part of the Department of Rare Books and Special Collections of the Princeton University Library. It is housed in the Harvey S. Firestone Memorial Library on the campus of Princeton University.

In 2015, following the death of William Scheide, the library was gifted to the University to be a part of the permanent collection. It marks the largest gift in the university's history.

The Scheide Library is the only library outside of Europe to possess all four of the first printed bibles:  The Gutenberg Bible, the 1460 Bible (or Mentelin Bible), the 36-line Bible, and the 1462 Bible. Other notable holdings include manuscripts by Abraham Lincoln, J.S. Bach, and Ludwig van Beethoven, a copy of the Declaration of Independence, and first editions of Shakespeare, and Milton. The library also holds significant collections of medieval manuscripts and incunabula, printed books on travel and exploration, and Americana.

The Scheide Library was assembled by three generations of collectors, William T. Scheide, his son, John H. Scheide, and grandson, William H. Scheide, who founded the Bach Aria Group, credited with reviving interest in Bach's cantatas.

References

External links

 Official website
 Guide to the Princeton University Library

Libraries in New Jersey
Private libraries in the United States
Princeton University